The Nokia 800 Tough is a Nokia-branded mobile phone developed by HMD Global. It was preceded by the Nokia 2720 Flip. It can survive a free fall from up to 1.8 meters (6'), is IP68 rated and conforms to MIL-STD-810G standard. It runs on the KaiOS operating system, and has a non-removable battery with a capacity of 2100 mAh.

It was unveiled at IFA 2019 together with the Nokia 110 (2019), Nokia 2720 Flip, Nokia 6.2, and Nokia 7.2.

References

800 Tough
Mobile phones introduced in 2019
Nokia phones by series